The 1800 United States presidential election in Vermont took place between October 31 and December 3, 1800, as part of the 1800 United States presidential election. The state legislature chose four representatives, or electors to the Electoral College, who voted for President and Vice President.

During this election, Vermont cast four electoral votes for incumbent Federalist President and New England native John Adams. However, Adams would lose to Democratic-Republican Party candidate Thomas Jefferson nationally.

See also
 United States presidential elections in Vermont

References

Vermont
1800
United States presidential